Occhiobello (Ferrarese: Ug’bèl) is a comune (municipality) in the Province of Rovigo in the Italian region Veneto, located about  southwest of Venice and about  southwest of Rovigo.

Twin towns
 Mennecy, France

References

External links
 www.comune.occhiobello.ro.it

Cities and towns in Veneto